Midnight Lightning is a posthumous compilation album by American rock guitarist Jimi Hendrix. It was released in November 1975 by Reprise Records in the US and Polydor Records in the UK. It was the second to be produced by Alan Douglas and Tony Bongiovi and contains demo-type recordings that were overdubbed with musicians who had never played with Hendrix. Despite including reworkings of the popular live songs "Hear My Train" and "Machine Gun", the album was not as well received as its predecessor, peaking at numbers 43 in the US and 46 in the UK.

Background 
Douglas continued the controversial methods he had adopted on Crash Landing and brought in many of the same session musicians to overdub parts of songs. The only original recording (apart from those by Hendrix) was Mitchell's drumming on "Hear My Train". In response to the previous outcry from fans and critics, Douglas did not claim co-writer credit for any songs on Midnight Lightning. After Experience Hendrix secured the rights to Hendrix's recordings in 1997, original versions of the tracks have been released on further albums and boxsets.

Critical reception 

In Christgau's Record Guide: Rock Albums of the Seventies (1981), Robert Christgau regarded Midnight Lightning as an improvement by Douglas over Crash Landing because of highlight instrumentals such as "Trash Man", overdubbed guitar from Jeff Mironov and Lance Quinn, and "the blues playing — as opposed to singing or writing". AllMusic's Joe Viglione later said the enduring quality of Hendrix's music was retained in spite of Douglas's "doctoring and musicians jamming with his art after the fact."

Track listing

Personnel
Jimi Hendrixguitars, vocals
Mitch Mitchelldrums on "Hear My Train"

Added in 1975
Jeff Mironov – guitar on tracks 1, 2, 3, 5 and 8
Lance Quinn – guitar on tracks 2, 4, 6 and 7
Allan Schwartzberg – drums on tracks 1, 2, 4–8, percussion on tracks 3 and 4
Bob Babbitt – bass guitar
Jimmy Maelen – percussion on tracks 2 and 8
Maeretha Stewart – backing vocals on tracks 2, 4 and 7
Barbara Massey – backing vocals on tracks 2, 4 and 7
Vivian Cherry – backing vocals on tracks 2, 4 and 7
Buddy Lucas – harmonica on track 7

References

External links 
 

1975 albums
Jimi Hendrix albums
Albums produced by Alan Douglas (record producer)
Albums published posthumously
Reprise Records albums